The Alabama-Coosa-Tallapoosa River Basin (ACT River Basin) is a drainage basin (watershed) in the Southeastern United States.  This area is classified as a sub-region by the USGS hydrological code system.

Sub-regions
This sub-region consists of two basins, per the hydrological code system, namely the Coosa-Tallapoosa basin, and the Alabama basin.

Further, here are the sub-basins of each of these two basins:

Coosa-Tallapoosa basin

 Conasauga sub-basin
 Coosawattee sub-basin
 Oostanaula sub-basin
 Etowah sub-basin
 Upper Coosa sub-basin
 Middle Coosa sub-basin
 Lower Coosa sub-basin
 Upper Tallapoosa sub-basin
 Middle Tallapoosa sub-basin
 Lower Tallapoosa sub-basin

Alabama basin

 Upper Alabama sub-basin
 Cahaba sub-basin
 Middle Alabama sub-basin
 Lower Alabama sub-basin

External links
 USACE page
 Georgia Soil and Water Conservation Commission Interactive Mapping Experience

 
Watersheds of the United States
Drainage basins of the Gulf of Mexico